PLATINUM BOX II is a DVD + VHS box set, released by Japanese singer Gackt on December 21, 2001. It contain 8 Music videos on the DVD, and a compilation of behind-the-scenes footage on the VHS.

DVD Content 
 Mizérable
 Vanilla
 Mirror
 OASIS
 Seki-ray
 Saikai 〜Story〜
 Secret Garden
 Kimi no Tameni Dekiru Koto

VHS Content 
 Recollections (behind-the-scenes footage)

References

2001 video albums
Gackt video albums
Music video compilation albums
2001 compilation albums